Frank Henry Benjamin Manush (September 18, 1883 – January 5, 1965) was a Major League Baseball third baseman. In 23 career games, he had 12 hits in 77 at-bats, with a .156 batting average. He batted and threw right-handed. Frank was the brother of Baseball Hall of Famer, Heinie Manush.

He was the manager of the Minor League Baseball team, the Albany Babies, in 1914 and 1915.

Manush was born in Tuscumbia, Alabama, and died in Laguna Beach, California.

Duke Baseball
Manush served as the head coach of Trinity College (now Duke University) in Durham, N.C., during the 1917 season. He finished with a 4-6-1 record.

External links
Baseball Reference.com page

1883 births
1965 deaths
People from Tuscumbia, Alabama
Philadelphia Athletics players
Major League Baseball third basemen
Baseball players from Alabama
Columbus Discoverers players
Savannah Indians players
Montgomery Climbers players
New Orleans Pelicans (baseball) players
Atlanta Crackers players
Albany Babies players
Rome Romans players
Durham Bulls players
Durham Bulls managers
American people of German descent